Érika Cristiano dos Santos (born 4 February 1988), commonly known as Érika, is a Brazilian professional footballer who plays for Corinthians and the Brazilian women's national team. Érika played as a forward for her clubs and Brazil's youth teams, but mainly as a central defender or "volante" (defensive midfielder) for the senior national team. She was part of Brazil's silver medal-winning team at the 2008 Beijing Olympics and also played at the 2011 FIFA Women's World Cup, the 2012 London Olympics, the 2016 Rio Olympics, and the 2020 Tokyo Olympics.

At the club level, Érika enjoyed three successful spells with Santos and was hurt when the male parent club disbanded the female section in 2012. She also spent the 2009 season with American Women's Professional Soccer (WPS) franchise FC Gold Pride. After the demise of Santos, Érika and nine other former Santos players agreed to join Centro Olímpico. She played for Paris Saint-Germain between 2015 and 2018 before returning to Brazil with Corinthians.

Club career
At six years old, Érika became the first female pupil at Marcelinho Carioca's football school. She then played futebol de salão for Associação Sabesp, where the rules were changed to allow her to compete against adults at the age of 12. Érika's mother arranged a place at Clube Atlético Juventus, where she began playing outdoors and quickly came to the attention of national youth team selectors and leading women's club Santos. With Santos Érika won the Campeonato Paulista in 2007 and the 2008 Copa do Brasil.

Érika was picked by FC Gold Pride, a team in the new Women's Professional Soccer from Santa Clara, California, in the 2008 WPS International Draft. The team's assistant coach was Sissi, Érika's compatriot and mentor. After appearing in seven FC Gold Pride games during 2009, Érika was made a free agent at the season's close by coach Albertin Montoya.

She returned to Santos and was part of the club's 2009 Copa Libertadores Femenina-winning team in November 2009, scoring twice in the 9–0 final win over UAA. The following month Santos retained the Copa do Brasil after beating Botucatu 3–0 in the final at Estádio do Pacaembu.

In early 2012, Santos' board of directors scrapped the women's section to save money after the club handed their male player Neymar a gigantic new contract. Érika was surprised and hurt by the development. She cried at the press conference announcement and publicly contemplated a contract offer from a South Korean club.

With Neymar's assistance, Érika and the displaced Santos players secured around $1,500,000 in external sponsorship. But Santos' board refused to reverse their decision, claiming that the women's team cost $2,000,000 a year to run and provided no financial return. Instead ten of the players including Érika moved to Centro Olímpico.

In late 2013, Érika suffered an anterior cruciate ligament injury, which kept her out of football for around ten months, until September 2014. In August 2015 Érika and compatriot Cristiane made a double transfer to French UEFA Women's Champions League contenders Paris Saint-Germain Féminines. Both were named in the 2015–16 French Football Federation Team of the Season. In January 2017 Paris Saint-Germain agreed to release Érika from the final six months of her contract, as she had returned to Brazil to rehabilitate an injury.

In July 2017, having recovered, she agreed to return to Paris Saint-Germain on a new one-year contract. She made 20 appearances in 2017–18, including the 1–0 Coupe de France Féminine final win over rivals Lyon. On the expiry of her contract she returned to Brazil for surgery on ovarian cysts. She had an offer from a Chinese club but preferred to stay close to her family after three years away. She accepted an offer to join Corinthians and remarked upon a "gigantic evolution" in Brazilian club football since she moved away to France.

Érika became an important part of a successful team at Corinthians, the club she supported. She suffered another anterior cruciate ligament injury in November 2021, when training with Corinthians in Paraguay during the 2021 Copa Libertadores Femenina. She returned to fitness, almost a year later, in time for the 2022 Copa Libertadores Femenina.

International career
At 15 years old, Érika played for Brazil at the 2004 FIFA U-19 Women's World Championship. She also featured at the 2006 edition of the event, which had changed to under-20 from under-19, as Brazil came third. Still eligible in 2008, Érika scored two goals in Brazil's run to the quarter-finals and was named in the tournament all-star team. She had been the joint top goal scorer with seven goals at the 2008 South American Under-20 Women's Football Championship, which served as the qualifying tournament.

In November 2006, Érika made her senior international debut in Brazil's 6–1 South American Women's Football Championship win over Bolivia at Estadio José María Minella, Mar del Plata. She was withdrawn from Brazil's 2007 Pan American Games squad two days before the tournament, with injured ankle ligaments.

At the 2008 edition of the Olympic Football Tournament, Érika replaced Andréia Rosa in central defence after the first match. She remained in the team and collected a silver medal when Brazil lost the final 1–0 after extra time to the United States.

In November 2010, Érika scored Brazil's first goal in a 5–0 2010 South American Women's Football Championship win over Colombia, which ensured qualification for the following year's FIFA Women's World Cup in Germany.

At the 2011 FIFA Women's World Cup, Érika scored Brazil's opening goal in a 3–0 win over Equatorial Guinea. Brazil then lost a controversial quarter-final on penalties to the United States after a 2–2 draw. American players, supporters and media were unhappy that Érika appeared to exaggerate an injury during extra time to use up valuable seconds. Érika was shown the yellow card and then Abby Wambach equalised in time which the referee had added on for the contentious injury.

Érika went to her second Olympic football tournament at London 2012. FIFA.com described her as one of the team's key players. Amidst allegations of a broken down bus plot, Brazil lost their final group E game 1–0 to hosts Great Britain before a record crowd of 70,584 at Wembley Stadium. That meant a quarter-final against World Cup holders Japan, who eliminated Brazil by winning 2–0 at Cardiff's Millennium Stadium.

She returned to the national team for the 2014 Torneio Internacional de Brasília de Futebol Feminino after almost two years away with injuries. She recalled playing in every outfield position for the national team, except on the wings, and was happy to keep fitting in where required. On the eve of the 2015 FIFA Women's World Cup, Érika sustained a knee injury and was replaced in the squad by Rafinha.

Érika recovered from her injury and was named to the Brazil squad for the 2016 Summer Olympics, her third Olympic tournament. She appeared in two matches, including the bronze medal match, which hosts Brazil lost 2–1 to Canada. Érika arrived at Brazil's training camp for the 2019 FIFA Women's World Cup with a sprained ankle, then suffered a calf injury. She was removed from the squad and replaced by Daiane Limeira.

At the 2020 Summer Olympics, postponed until 2021 by the COVID-19 pandemic, Érika participated in her fourth Olympic Games.

Career statistics

International

Updated 30 July 2021.

International goals

Personal life
Érika is an outspoken advocate of women's football in Brazil. When Brazil lost 5–1 to Germany at the 2014 FIFA U-20 Women's World Cup, she rejected misleading comparisons to the wealthy male team's recent 7–1 defeat by Germany at the 2014 FIFA World Cup. In a damning open letter, signed by 100 female athletes, she branded Brazil "a sexist and bigoted country that never believed in, accepted, or invested properly in women's football".

One of Érika's coaches at youth level was Marcinha, a pioneering veteran of EC Radar and Brazil's 1991 FIFA Women's World Cup squad.

Honors

Individual	
 IFFHS CONMEBOL Woman Team of the Decade 2011–2020

References

External links

 
 
 2008 Olympics player profile
 Santos FC player profile
 Women's Professional Soccer player profile
 

1988 births
Living people
Brazilian women's footballers
Women's association football defenders
Olympic footballers of Brazil
Olympic silver medalists for Brazil
Footballers at the 2008 Summer Olympics
Footballers at the 2012 Summer Olympics
Footballers at the 2016 Summer Olympics
FC Gold Pride players
2011 FIFA Women's World Cup players
Olympic medalists in football
Santos FC (women) players
Medalists at the 2008 Summer Olympics
Brazil women's international footballers
Associação Desportiva Centro Olímpico players
Footballers from São Paulo
Expatriate women's soccer players in the United States
Brazilian expatriate women's footballers
Brazilian expatriate sportspeople in the United States
Women's Professional Soccer players
Paris Saint-Germain Féminine players
Expatriate women's footballers in France
Brazilian expatriate sportspeople in France
Division 1 Féminine players
Sport Club Corinthians Paulista (women) players
Pan American Games medalists in football
Pan American Games gold medalists for Brazil
Footballers at the 2015 Pan American Games
Medalists at the 2015 Pan American Games
Footballers at the 2020 Summer Olympics